The Central Regional Minister is the Ghana government official who is responsible for overseeing the administration of the Central Region of Ghana. The area currently covered by the Central Region used to be part of the Western Province in the Gold Coast under British colonial rule. The Western Province which had become the Western Region after Ghana became an independent country was split into the Western and Central Regions. The seat of the regional administration is located in Cape Coast, the capital.

List of Central Regional Ministers

See also

Ministers of the Ghanaian Government
Central Region

Notes

Politics of Ghana
Central Regional Minister